Song of the New World is a 1973 album by jazz pianist McCoy Tyner, his fourth to be released on the Milestone label. It was recorded in April 1973 and features performances by Tyner with a big band including saxophonist  Sonny Fortune, flautist Hubert Laws, bassist Joony Booth and drummer Alphonse Mouzon along with a brass section, and a full string section on two tracks conducted by William Fischer.

Reception
The Allmusic review by Scott Yanow states: "The powerful pianist is in fine form and the main soloist throughout. Most memorable is the title cut and a reworking of 'Afro Blue'."

Track listing
 "Afro Blue" (Santamaría) - 10:01 
 "Little Brother" - 10:12
 "The Divine Love" - 7:31
 "Some Day" - 6:50
 "Song of the New World" - 6:50

All compositions by McCoy Tyner except as indicated

Personnel
McCoy Tyner: piano, percussion
Hubert Laws: piccolo, flute
Sonny Fortune: alto saxophone, soprano saxophone, flute
Joony Booth: bass  
Alphonse Mouzon: drums
Cecil Bridgewater: trumpet (tracks 1, 2 & 4)
Jon Faddis: trumpet (tracks 1, 2 & 4)
Virgil Jones: trumpet (tracks 1, 2 & 4)
Garnett Brown: trombone (tracks 1, 2 & 4)
Dick Griffin: trombone, baritone trombone (tracks 1, 2 & 4)
Willie Ruff: french horn (tracks 1, 2 & 4)
William Warnick III: french horn (tracks 1, 2 & 4)
Julius Watkins: french horn (tracks 1, 2 & 4)
Kiane Zawadi: euphonium (tracks 1, 2 & 4)
Bob Stewart: tuba (tracks 1, 2 & 4)
Sonny Morgan:  conga drums (tracks 1 & 2) 
Harry Smyle: oboe (tracks 3 & 5)
Sanford Allen: violin  (tracks 3 & 5)
John Blair: violin  (tracks 3 & 5)
Selwart Clarke: violin  (tracks 3 & 5)
Winston Collymore: violin  (tracks 3 & 5)
Noel DaCosta: violin  (tracks 3 & 5)
Marie Hence: violin  (tracks 3 & 5)
Julian Barber: viola  (tracks 3 & 5)
Alfred Brown: viola  (tracks 3 & 5)
Ronald Lipscomb: cello  (tracks 3 & 5)
Kermit Moore: cello  (tracks 3 & 5)
William Fischer: conductor  (tracks 3 & 5)

References

McCoy Tyner albums
1973 albums
Milestone Records albums
Albums produced by Orrin Keepnews